KIPE is a class A radio station broadcasting in Pine Hills, California

History
KIPE began broadcasting on January 9, 2015.

References

External links
 

Mass media in Humboldt County, California
2015 establishments in California
IPE
Radio stations established in 2015